Elizabeth Ann Bayley Seton  (August 28, 1774 – January 4, 1821) was a Catholic religious sister in the United States and an educator, known as a founder of the country's parochial school system. After her death, she became the first person born in what would become the United States to be canonized by the Catholic Church (September 14, 1975). She also established the first Catholic girls' school in the nation in Emmitsburg, Maryland, where she likewise founded the first American congregation of religious sisters, the Sisters of Charity.

Biography

Early life
Elizabeth Ann Bayley was born on August 28, 1774, the second child of a socially prominent couple, a surgeon, Richard Bayley and Catherine Charlton of New York City. The Bayley and Charlton families were among the earliest European settlers in the New York area. Her father's parents were of French Huguenot and English descent and lived in New Rochelle, New York. As Chief Health Officer for the Port of New York, Bayley attended to immigrants disembarking from ships onto Staten Island and cared for New Yorkers when yellow fever swept through the city (for example, killing 700 in four months). Bayley later served as the first professor of anatomy at Columbia College. Elizabeth's mother was the daughter of a Church of England priest who was rector of St. Andrew's Church on Staten Island for 30 years. Elizabeth was raised in what would eventually become (in the years after the American Revolution) the Episcopal Church.

Her mother, Catherine, died in 1777 when Elizabeth was three years old, possibly due to complications from the birth of her namesake Catherine, who died early the following year. Elizabeth's father then married Charlotte Amelia Barclay, a member of the Jacobus James Roosevelt family, to provide a mother for his two surviving daughters. The new Mrs. Bayley participated in her church's social ministry and often took young Elizabeth with her on charitable rounds. They visited the poor in their homes to distribute food and needed items.

The couple had five children, but the marriage ended in separation. During the breakup, their stepmother rejected Elizabeth and her older sister. Their father then traveled to London for further medical studies, so the sisters lived temporarily in New Rochelle with their paternal uncle, William Bayley, and his wife, Sarah Pell Bayley. Elizabeth endured a time of darkness, grieving the absence of a second mother, as she later reflected in her journals. In these journals, Elizabeth showed her love for nature, poetry, and music, especially the piano. Other entries expressed her religious aspirations and favorite passages from her reading, showing her introspection and natural bent toward contemplation. Elizabeth was fluent in French, a fine musician, and an accomplished horsewoman.

Marriage and motherhood 
On January 25, 1794, at age 19, Elizabeth married William Magee Seton, aged 25, a wealthy businessman in the import trade. Samuel Provoost, the first Episcopal bishop of New York, presided at their wedding. Her husband's father, William Seton (1746–1798), belonged to an impoverished noble Scottish family, emigrated to New York in 1758, and became superintendent and part-owner of the iron-works of Ringwood, New Jersey. A loyalist, the senior William Seton was the last royal public notary for the city and province of New York. He brought his sons William (Elizabeth's husband) and James into the import-export mercantile firm, the William Seton Company, which became Seton, Maitland, and Company in 1793. The younger William had visited important counting houses in Europe in 1788, was a friend of Filippo Filicchi (a renowned merchant in Leghorn, Italy, with whom his firm traded), and brought the first Stradivarius violin to America.

Shortly after they married, Elizabeth and William moved into a fashionable residence on Wall Street. Socially prominent in New York society, the Setons belonged to Trinity Episcopal Church, near Broadway and Wall Streets. A devout communicant, Elizabeth took John Henry Hobart (later a bishop) as her spiritual director. Along with her sister-in-law Rebecca Mary Seton (1780–1804) (her soul-friend and dearest confidante), Elizabeth continued her former stepmother's social ministry—nursing the sick and dying among family, friends, and needy neighbors. Influenced by her father, she became a charter member of The Society for the Relief of Poor Widows with Small Children (1797) and served as its treasurer.

When the elder William Seton died, the Seton family fortunes waned during the volatile economic climate preceding the War of 1812. The couple took in William's six younger siblings, ages seven to seventeen, in addition to their own five children: Anna Maria (Annina) (1795–1812), William II (1796–1868), Richard Seton (1798–1823), Catherine (1800–1891) (who was to become the first American to join the Sisters of Mercy) and Rebecca Mary (1802–1816). This necessitated a move to the larger Seton family residence.

Widowhood and conversion to Catholicism 

A dispute between the United States of America and the French Republic from 1798 to 1800 led to a series of attacks on American shipping. The United Kingdom's blockade of France, and the loss of several of his ships at sea, led William Seton into bankruptcy, and the Setons lost their home at 61 Stone Street in lower Manhattan. The following summer, Elizabeth and the children stayed with her father, who was still the health officer for the Port of New York on Staten Island. From 1801 to 1803, they lived in a house at 8 State Street, on the site of the present Church of Our Lady of the Most Holy Rosary (built in 1964). Through most of their married life, William Seton suffered from tuberculosis. The stress worsened his illness; his doctors sent him to Italy for the warmer climate, with Elizabeth and their eldest daughter as his companions. Upon landing at the port of Leghorn, they were held in quarantine for a month, for authorities feared they might have brought yellow fever from New York. William died on December 27, 1803, and was buried in Italy's Old English Cemetery. Elizabeth and Anna Maria were received by the families of her late husband's Italian business partners, Filippo and Antonio Filicchi, who introduced her to Catholicism.

Returning to New York, the widow Seton was received into the Catholic Church on March 14, 1805, by Matthew O'Brien, pastor of St. Peter's Church, then the city's only Catholic church. (Anti-Catholic laws had been lifted just a few years before.) A year later, she received the sacrament of confirmation from the Bishop of Baltimore, John Carroll, the only Catholic bishop in the nation.

To support herself and her children, Seton had started an academy for young ladies, as was common for widows of social standing in that period. After news of her conversion to Catholicism spread, most parents withdrew their daughters from her school. In 1807, students attending a local Protestant Academy were boarded at her house on Stuyvesant Lane in the Bowery, near St. Mark's Church.

Seton was about to move to Canada when she met a visiting priest, Louis William Valentine Dubourg, who was a member of the French émigré community of Sulpician Fathers and then president of St. Mary's College, Baltimore. The Sulpicians had taken refuge in the United States from the religious persecution of the Reign of Terror in France. They were in the process of establishing the first Catholic seminary for the United States, in keeping with the goals of their society. For several years, Dubourg had envisioned a religious school to meet the educational needs of the new nation's small Catholic community.

Founder
After living through many difficulties in life, in 1809, Seton accepted the Sulpicians' invitation and moved to Emmitsburg, Maryland. A year later, she established the Saint Joseph's Academy and Free School, a school dedicated to Catholic girls' education. This was possible due to the financial support of Samuel Sutherland Cooper, a wealthy convert and seminarian at the newly established Mount Saint Mary's University, begun by John Dubois, S.S., and the Sulpicians.

On July 31, Seton established a religious community in Emmitsburg dedicated to the care of the children of the poor. This was the first congregation of religious sisters founded in the United States, and its school was the first free Catholic school in America. This modest beginning marked the start of the Catholic parochial school system in the United States. The congregation was initially called the Sisters of Charity of St. Joseph's. From that point on, she became known as "Mother Seton." In 1811, the sisters adopted the rules of the Daughters of Charity, co-founded in France by Vincent de Paul and Louise de Marillac.

Later life and death

The remainder of Seton's life was spent leading and developing the new congregation. Seton was described as a charming and cultured lady. Her connections to New York society and the accompanying social pressures to leave the new life she had created for herself did not deter her from embracing her religious vocation and charitable mission. The most significant difficulties she faced were internal, stemming from misunderstandings, interpersonal conflicts, and the deaths of two daughters, other loved ones, and young sisters in the community.

Elizabeth Ann Seton died on January 4, 1821, at the age of 46. Today, her remains are interred in the National Shrine of Saint Elizabeth Ann Seton in Emmitsburg, Maryland.

Legacy

By 1830, the Sisters of Charity of St. Joseph's were running orphanages and schools as far west as Cincinnati and New Orleans and had established the first hospital west of the Mississippi in St. Louis.

It had been Seton's original intention to join the Daughters of Charity of St. Vincent de Paul, but the embargo of France due to the Napoleonic Wars prevented this connection. It was only decades later, in 1850, that the Emmitsburg community took steps to merge with the Daughters and become their first American branch, as their foundress had envisioned.

Today, six separate religious congregations trace their roots to the beginnings of the Sisters of Charity in Emmitsburg. In addition to the original community of Sisters at Emmitsburg (now part of the Vincentian order), they are based in New York City; Cincinnati, Ohio; Halifax, Nova Scotia; Convent Station, New Jersey; and Greensburg, Pennsylvania. The community at Convent Station established the Academy of Saint Elizabeth in 1860 and the College of Saint Elizabeth in 1899.

Elizabeth Ann Seton has also been inducted into the National Women's Hall of Fame.

Canonization
In 1952, a miracle involving the healing of 4 year old Ann O'Neil from leukemia was attributed to the intercession of Seton after a nun prayed for the girl to Seton. The miracle was a factor in the beatification of Seton and Seton was beatified by Pope John XXIII on March 17, 1963. The pope said on the occasion, "In a house that was very small, but with ample space for charity, she sowed a seed in America which by Divine Grace grew into a large tree."

Pope Paul VI canonized Seton on September 14, 1975, in a ceremony in St. Peter's Square. In his words, "Elizabeth Ann Seton is a saint. St. Elizabeth Ann Seton is an American. All of us say this with special joy and with the intention of honoring the land and the nation from which she sprang forth as the first flower in the calendar of the saints. Elizabeth Ann Seton was wholly American! Rejoice for your glorious daughter. Be proud of her. And know how to preserve her fruitful heritage." The miracle which led to the canonization of Seton involved the healing of a man in 1963, who was given hours to live after contracting meningitis and having encephalitis in his brain.

Seton's feast day is January 4, the eleventh day of Christmastide and the anniversary of her death.

Seton is the patron saint of seafarers and widows.

Elizabeth Ann Seton is honored on the liturgical calendar of the Episcopal Church in the United States of America on January 4.

Eponymous institutions

Hospital 
The Daughters of Charity Health Network established Bayley Seton Hospital in 1980 on the site of the former Marine Hospital Service hospital in Stapleton, Staten Island, New York. Most of the property is now the Bayley Seton campus of Richmond University Medical Center, while a portion is used by New York Foundling, a Catholic social services organization.

Schools 
Mother Seton School in Emmitsburg, Maryland, is a direct descendant of the Saint Joseph's Academy and Free School. It is located less than a mile from the site of the original school and is sponsored by the Daughters of Charity. Mother Seton School is a private elementary school located in Emmitsburg and enrolls 306 students from pre-kindergarten through 8th grade. Mother Seton School is the 84th-largest private school in Maryland and the 3,381st-largest nationally. It has 15 students to every teacher.

In the Philippines, the Elizabeth Seton School in BF Resort Village, Las Piñas was established in 1975, the year of Seton's canonization. It is the largest Catholic school in the city in terms of population.

Elizabeth Seton College, located in Yonkers, New York, was a college opened to assist young struggling women and men in need of furthering their education, offering Associate of Science or Associate of Occupational Science degrees. It merged with Iona College in 1989.

Seton Hall College (now known as Seton Hall University) in South Orange, New Jersey, was founded in 1856 by Seton's nephew Bishop James Roosevelt Bayley and named after his aunt. As was Seton Hall Preparatory School, an all-boys High School in West Orange, New Jersey, that was formerly associated with the University, but is now independent.

The Seton Hill Schools (now part of Seton Hill University), named for Seton, were founded by the Sisters of Charity in 1885. The university continues to operate in Greensburg, Pennsylvania, under the auspices of the Sisters of Charity of Seton Hill.

Elizabeth Seton High School, an all-girls Catholic school in Bladensburg, Maryland, sponsored by the Daughters of Charity, is named in honor of Seton.

Seton Academy (1963–2016) was a high school in South Holland, Illinois.

Seton Catholic High School (1900–2007) was a high school in Pittston, Pennsylvania.

Seton School in Manassas, Virginia is also named for Mother Seton.

Seton Catholic School (K-8) Hudson, Ohio

The College of Mount Saint Vincent in Bronx, New York, was founded by the Sisters of Charity of New York and traces its lineage to Seton.  It features the Elizabeth Seton Library and the Italian Renaissance-style Seton Hall, with a cornerstone set by John Cardinal Farley in November 1911.

Niagara University in Lewiston, New York, near Niagara Falls, also has a dormitory building named after her, called Seton Hall.

St. Elizabeth Seton is a K-9 school in Calgary, Alberta

Sacred Heart University in Fairfield, Connecticut, has a residence hall named after her, called Elizabeth Ann Seton Hall.

Churches 
Several Catholic churches are named for Seton. The first parish named in her honor, Blessed Elizabeth Ann Seton, was established in 1963 in Shrub Oak, New York, with a school opening in 1966, staffed by the Sisters of Charity. 

Upon her canonization in 1975, St. Elizabeth Ann Seton Catholic Church was established in Crofton, Maryland, in the same Archdiocese of Baltimore where she had founded Saint Joseph's Academy and Free School. 

, there are churches in her name in more than 40 states of the United States, plus Canada and Italy.

Buildings 
The College of Mount Saint Vincent in Bronx, New York, was founded by the Sisters of Charity of New York and traces its lineage to Seton.  It features the Elizabeth Seton Library and the Italian Renaissance-style Seton Hall, with a cornerstone set by John Cardinal Farley in November 1911.

Niagara University in Lewiston, New York, near Niagara Falls, also has a dormitory building named after her, called Seton Hall.

Sacred Heart University in Fairfield, Connecticut, has a residence hall named after her, called Elizabeth Ann Seton Hall.

Charities 

Seton Villa, a small charity for providing accommodation for women with disabilities, was established in 1966 by the Daughters of Charity of St Vincent de Paul in Sydney, Australia.

See also
 Saint Elizabeth Ann Seton, patron saint archive

References

Further reading
 O'Donnell, Catherine. Elizabeth Seton: American Saint (Cornell University Press, 2018).
 O'Donnell, Catherine. "Elizabeth Seton Transatlantic Cooperation, Spiritual Struggle, and the Early Republican Church", U.S. Catholic Historian 29 (Winter 2011), 1–17.

External links

Full text of the homily by Pope Paul VI on the occasion of Seton's canonization (September 14, 1975)
Full text of the homily by Pope John XXIII on the occasion of Seton's beatification (March 17, 1963) (in Italian)
Prayers to St. Elizabeth Ann Seton

St. Elizabeth Ann Seton Online Museum (archived January 16, 2014)

1774 births
1821 deaths
18th-century Christian saints
19th-century Christian saints
19th-century deaths from tuberculosis
American people of English descent
American people of French descent
19th-century American Roman Catholic nuns
American Roman Catholic saints
Bayley family
Beatifications by Pope John XXIII
Burials in Maryland
Catholic saints who converted from Protestantism
Christian female saints of the Early Modern era
Christian female saints of the Late Modern era
Canonizations by Pope Paul VI
Catholics from Maryland
Catholics from New York (state)
Converts to Roman Catholicism from Anglicanism
Daughters and Sisters of Charity of St. Vincent de Paul
Educators from New York City
American women educators
Founders of Catholic religious communities
People from Emmitsburg, Maryland
People of the Roman Catholic Archdiocese of New York
Tuberculosis deaths in Maryland
Anglican saints